The Blue Peter was originally a blue maritime signal flag meaning "P" or "outward bound", flown to warn a ship's crew in port of an imminent sailing.

Blue Peter also may refer to:
Blue Peter, a British television programme.
 Blu Peter, Peter Harris (producer) (born 1961) in music
 Music:
 Blue Peter (instrumental), 1979 release of the Blue Peter theme tune
 Blue Peter (band), Canadian 
 Film:
 The Blue Peter (1928 film)
 The Blue Peter (1955 film)
 Horses:
 Blue Peter (British horse) (born 1936)
 Blue Peter (American horse) (born 1946)

 Blue Peter Book Award 
 The Blue Peter (magazine), a British sea travel monthly, with artwork by Jack Spurling
 Locomotive LNER Peppercorn Class A2 60532 Blue Peter
 The letter P, International Code of Signals